Lal in Iran may refer to:
 Lal-e Tazehabad